Goethe House may refer to:

Goethe House, Frankfurt am Main, Germany
Goethe House (Weimar), Germany
Goethe House (Sacramento), California, United States
 Goethe-Haus, the original home of Goethe-Institut, New York, United States
Casa di Goethe, Rome, Italy